Fishtown is an unincorporated community in Taylor Township, Harrison County, Indiana.

History
A post office was established at Fishtown in 1904, and remained in operation until it was discontinued in 1907.

Geography

References

Unincorporated communities in Harrison County, Indiana
Unincorporated communities in Indiana
Louisville metropolitan area
Indiana populated places on the Ohio River